The mycorrhizosphere is the region around a mycorrhizal fungus in which nutrients released from the fungus increase the microbial population and its activities. The roots of most terrestrial plants, including most crop plants and almost all woody plants, are colonized by mycorrhiza-forming symbiotic fungi. In this relationship, the plant roots are infected by a fungus, but the rest of the fungal mycelium continues to grow through the soil, digesting and absorbing nutrients and water and sharing these with its plant host. The fungus in turn benefits by receiving photosynthetic sugars from its host. The mycorrhizosphere consists of roots, hyphae of the directly connected mycorrhizal fungi, associated microorganisms, and the soil in their direct influence.

Organisms involved
The mycorrhizosphere involves a community of microorganisms. There are three divisions of fungi that can form mycorrhizae, the Glomeromycota, Ascomycota, and Basidiomycota. Glomeromycota can form arbuscular mycorrhizae with angiosperms (flowering plants), gymnosperms (seed-producing plants), pteridophytes, mosses, lycopods, and Psilotales. Ascomycota fungi form ericoid mycorrhizas with plants of the order Ericales, and ectomycorrhizas with trees. Basidiomycota fungi form ecto-, orchid, monotropoid, arbutoid, and some ericoid mycorrhizae. Fungal hyphae are thinner than plant roots, which allows them to penetrate areas in the soil with moisture and nutrient that are inaccessible to roots. In some cases, mycorrhizal fungi in the mycorrhizosphere may ward off fungal plant pathogens. For example, the arbuscular mycorrhizal fungus Glomus intraradices reduces germination of the pathogen Fusarium oxysporum, but stimulates germination of a non-pathogenic fungus Trichoderma harzianum.

Soil bacteria in the mycorrhizosphere influence plant growth in several ways: by affecting the uptake of nutrients, providing protection against pathogens, contributing to nitrogen fixation, and contributing to mineral weathering. Archaea are also known to exist in mycorrhizosphere. They may contribute to nitrogen fixation and produce antibiotic compounds, but the extent of their interactions with other organisms and their overall function is not well known. Soil protozoa feed on bacteria, and, in some cases, hyphae. The type of mycorrhizae greatly influences the protozoal population in a mycorrhizosphere. For example, a Paxillus involutus–conifer mycorrhiza seems to reduce the density of protozoa in the resulting mycorrhizosphere, but mycorrhizae formed with Lactarius rufus and Suillus bovinus have the opposite effect. Other soil organisms that influence the mycorrhizosphere community include soil animals such as nematodes, mites, and earthworms, which forage on roots, hyphae and their associated microorganisms.

References

Fungus ecology
Soil biology
Plant roots
Environmental soil science